Wentzville Tobacco Company Factory was a historic tobacco factory located at Wentzville, St. Charles County, Missouri.  It was built in 1885, and is a 2 1/2-story, three bay by six bay brick building with timber framing.  It measures approximately 40 feet by 90 feet and has a gable roof with long shed dormers.

Despite being listed on the National Register of Historic Places in 1990, the historic building was demolished in 2002 and replaced with a parking lot. A historic marker was placed next to the parking lot on the site of the former building.

References

Industrial buildings and structures on the National Register of Historic Places in Missouri
Industrial buildings completed in 1885
Buildings and structures in St. Charles County, Missouri
National Register of Historic Places in St. Charles County, Missouri
Tobacco buildings in the United States
Demolished buildings and structures in Missouri
Buildings and structures demolished in 2002
1885 establishments in Missouri